The Atherton Tableland is a fertile plateau, which is part of the Great Dividing Range in Queensland, Australia. It has very deep, rich basaltic soils and the main industry is agriculture. The principal river flowing across the plateau is the Barron River, which was dammed to form the irrigation reservoir named Lake Tinaroo.

Physiography
This area is a distinct physiographic section of the larger North Queensland Highlands province, which in turn is part of the larger East Australian Cordillera physiographic division. South of the Tablelands is the Bellenden Ker Range.

Geological history 
About 100 million years ago, the eastern edge of the Australian continent extended much further to the east, before tectonic forces fractured the eastern margin, pulling it apart. At the same time, slowly rising mantle material caused a doming up of the continental crust. As the eastern part of the continent broke away, it gradually sank below sea level.  Since that time, the uplifted western portion has been slowly eroding westwards, creating the abrupt Great Escarpment, which separates the coastal plain to the east from the uplifted tablelands to the west.

From over 4 million to less than 10,000 years ago, a series of volcanic eruptions occurred over the Atherton Tablelands. The oldest eruptions created large, gently sloping “shield volcanoes” that produced extensive basalt flows. These flows filled the pre-existing valleys, producing a relatively flat tableland surface, instead of the more dissected landscape that would have existed previously. About one million years ago, the style of eruption changed. The lavas became more gas-charged, throwing fragmented lava into the air which built the numerous, small scoria cones, such as the Seven Sisters, near Yungaburra. Some of the rising magma interacted with groundwater, producing violent eruptions that led to the formation of maar volcanoes, such as Lake Eacham and Lake Barrine. Although all the volcanoes in the Atherton Basalt Province are regarded as being extinct and volcanism has been waning over time, given the relatively recent activity, it is possible that further eruptions could occur in the future.

History
The Atherton Tableland Region has a long history of Indigenous occupation.  Aspects of traditional Aboriginal land use and culture have been documented from the period of first contact to the present.  Aboriginal people with ties to the region seek to maintain their culture today, despite a long period of forced removal from their lands following European occupation in the late 19th-early 20th century.

Yidinji (also known as Yidinj, Yidiny, and Idindji) is an Australian Aboriginal language. Its traditional language region is within the local government areas of Cairns Region and Tablelands Region, in such localities as Cairns, Gordonvale, and the Mulgrave River, and the southern part of the Atherton Tableland including Atherton and Kairi.

Dyirbal (also known as Djirbal) is a language of Far North Queensland, particularly the area around Tully and Tully River Catchment extending to the Atherton Tablelands. The Dyirbal language region includes the landscape within the local government boundaries of Cassowary Coast Regional Council and Tablelands Regional Council.

Atherton was explored by a European, J.V. Mulligan, in 1875. In 1877, John Atherton settled near the town which now bears his name. The area was originally explored for its mining potential where deposits of tin and gold were found.

Atherton Creek is named after John Atherton,  who settled at Emerald End, (later Mareeba) in 1875.

The first European exploration of this area, part of the traditional land of the Dyirbal, was undertaken in 1875 by James Venture Mulligan. Mulligan was prospecting for gold, but instead found tin. The town of Herberton was established on 19 April 1880 by John Newell to exploit the tin find, and mining began on 9 May. By the September of that year, Herberton had a population of 300 men and 27 women.

In the late 19th century the Mulligan Highway was carved through the hills from Herberton and passed through what is now Main Street, Atherton, before continuing down to Port Douglas. This road was used by the coaches of Cobb and Co to access Western Queensland.

At its apogee, Herberton was the richest tin mining field in Australia, and was home to 17 pubs, 2 local newspapers and a brewery.

Industry
Originally a pioneering pastoralist, John Atherton was the first to find tin deposits in Herberton in 1880 Northern Queensland. Local legend has it that Tinaroo Creek received its name from Atherton who shouted, "Tin! Hurroo!" when he first made his discovery. Atherton and his friends, William Jack and John Newell, discovered the famous lode in Herberton, which became the Great Northern Tin Mine. A rush of miners from the Hodgkinson's Goldfields followed. The construction of a dray road through the Tableland brought a secondary rush, this time timber cutters to mine the red gold (redcedar) of the rainforest. Redcedar cutters camps were at Rocky Creek, Prior Pocket, Oonda Swamp (Carrington) & Ziggenbein's Pocket. Although tin was a major part in the Tablelands, timber is what Atherton owes its existence to with large areas of red cedar, kauri, maple, black bean, walnut, white beech and red tulip oak being milled for buildings.

Before the town of Atherton developed, a full-blown Chinatown sprang into existence. The Chinese had moved from the Palmer River Goldfields to the Atherton area, where the big timber stands had been cleared to make way for farming. The Chinese were considered pioneers of agriculture in North Queensland as 80% of crop production on the Tablelands was grown by them and they played a vital role in opening up the area for settlement. After the crops, they turned to dairying. As the population of Chinatown increased, small shops appeared, wells were sunk to supply water, there were cooks, herbalists, doctors and merchants etc. The rough straw huts were replaced by sawn timber houses with verandahs and corrugated iron roofs. By 1909, Chinatown had become the largest concentration of Chinese on the Tablelands with a population of 1100. Today, the Hou Wang Temple remains as one of the few reminders of the former Chinese population of the Atherton Tablelands.

In the Second World War, Australian troops were camped around the district prior to being sent to the front and then again on their return. Many soldiers were interred at the war cemetery in Atherton.

Crops grown in and around Atherton include banana, sugarcane, corn/maize, avocados, strawberries, macadamia nuts and mangoes and citrus. Tobacco was also grown until  when it was ended by a Government buyout. Dairying, grazing and poultry are also present on the Tableland.

Tourism
Tourism is the second largest economic driver of the Atherton Tablelands economy, with Tinaroo Dam and extensive trail network being the focal point.

Towns
Atherton and Mareeba are the largest towns in the area. Herberton, Kairi, Kuranda, Malanda, Millaa Millaa, Tinaroo, Tolga, Yungaburra, Chillagoe, Walkamin and Ravenshoe are also located on the Atherton Tablelands.

Environment

The tableland contains several small remnants of the rainforest which once covered it, many of which are now protected in national parks.  It is classified by BirdLife International as one of Australia's Important Bird Areas, supporting over 1% of the world population of the sarus crane and a significant population of the bush stone-curlew. Twelve species of birds are endemic to this area and the mountain ranges immediately south: Atherton scrubwren, Bower's shrikethrush, bridled honeyeater, chowchilla, fernwren, golden bowerbird, grey-headed robin, Macleay's honeyeater, mountain thornbill, pied monarch, tooth-billed bowerbird and Victoria's riflebird.

Places of interest

Lake Barrine
Lake Eacham
Curtain Fig Tree near Yungaburra.
Undara Volcanic National Park
Hann Tableland National Park
Mount Hypipamee Crater and Dinner Falls
Herberton, Queensland
Kuranda
Chillagoe
Mareeba
Atherton

See also

Barkly Tableland
Regions of Queensland
Tablelands Region

References

External links

Tablelands Regional Council
Mareeba Shire Council
Atherton Tablelands

Geography of Far North Queensland
Physiographic sections
Regions of Queensland
Important Bird Areas of Queensland
Plateaus of Australia
Great Dividing Range
Agriculture in Queensland
Tourist attractions in Far North Queensland
Ecoregions of Queensland